Crego may refer to:

 Crego (surname), surname
 Crego Park, park
 Mrs. I. L. Crego House, historic house in Baldwinsville, New York, United States of America